John Hart or Johnny Hart may refer to:

Arts and entertainment
 John Hart (actor) (1917–2009), American actor
 John Hart (dancer) (1921–2015), English ballet dancer, choreographer and artistic director
 Johnny Hart (1931–2007), American cartoonist
 John Hart (author) (born 1965), American novelist
 John Hart (producer), American film and theater producer
 Captain John Hart (Torchwood), fictional character on Torchwood

Military
 John Hart (soldier) (1706–1777), American soldier
 John E. Hart (1824–1863), American naval officer during the Civil War
 John W. Hart (1833–1907), American Civil War soldier and Medal of Honor recipient
 John Hart (RAF officer) (1916–2019), Canadian pilot in the Royal Air Force

Politics
 John Hart (colonial administrator) (flourished 1714–1720), royal governor of Maryland and later the Leeward Islands
 John Hart (New Jersey politician) (c. 1711–1779), delegate from New Jersey to the Continental Congress and a signer of the United States Declaration of Independence
 John Hart (doctor) (1751–1836), American surgeon and politician
 John Hart (South Australian colonist) (1809–1873), "Capt. John Hart", sailor, mill-owner and politician
 John Hart (Tasmanian politician) (1829–1896), member of the Tasmanian House of Assembly
 John Shadrach Hart (1838–1912), New South Wales politician
 John Hart Jr. (1848–1881), member of the South Australian House of Assembly
 John M. Hart (1866–1955), American politician
 John Hart (Canadian politician) (1879–1957), premier of British Columbia in 1940s
 Jack Hart (state senator) (John A. Hart, Jr.), Democratic member of the Massachusetts State Senate
 John Hart Ely, legal scholar
 John Hart, aka James L. Hart, U.S. congressional candidate in 2004 and 2006

Religion
 John Hart (Jesuit) (died 1586), English priest
 John Stephen Hart (bishop) (1866–1952), bishop in the Anglican Church of Australia

Sports
 Johnny Hart (Australian footballer) (1888–1966), Australian footballer for Essendon
 John Hart (speedway rider) (born 1941), English speedway rider
 John Hart (rugby union coach) (born 1946), New Zealand rugby union coach
 Johnny Hart (English footballer) (1928–2018), English footballer and manager
 John Hart (baseball) (born 1948), American baseball vice-president and general manager
 John Hart (rugby union, born 1982), British rugby player
 John Hart (rugby union, born 1928) (1928–2007), Scottish rugby union player
 Johnny Hart (Scottish footballer), Scottish footballer and coach

Other
 John Hart (spelling reformer) (died 1574), English grammarian and officer of arms
 John Seely Hart (1810–1877), American author and educator
 John Hart (journalist) (born 1932), American journalist
 John Hart (classicist) (1936–2011), first male winner of UK Mastermind
 John P. Hart (born 1960), American activist
 John Fraser Hart (born 1924), geographer and WWII veteran

See also
 John Harte (disambiguation)
 John De Hart (1727–1795), American lawyer, jurist, statesman, Continental Congress delegate
 John O'Hart (1824–1902), Irish genealogist
 Jonn Hart (born 1989), American R&B singer